Villalcampo is a municipality located in the province of Zamora, Castile and León, Spain. According to the 2004 census (INE), the municipality has a population of 624 inhabitants.

Town hall
Villalcampo is home to the town hall of 3 villages:
Villalcampo (288 inhabitants, INE 2020).
Carbajosa (123 inhabitants, INE 2020).
Salto de Villalcampo (0 inhabitants, INE 2020).

References

Municipalities of the Province of Zamora